Story of a Poor Young Man (Spanish:La novela de un joven pobre) may refer to:

 Story of a Poor Young Man (1942 film), an Argentine film directed by Luis Bayón Herrera
Story of a Poor Young Man (1968 film), an Argentine film directed by Enrique Cahen Salaberry 
 The Story of a Poor Young Man (1920 film), a 1920 Italian silent drama film